Cypripedium acaule is a species of flowering plant in the orchid family Orchidaceae. It is commonly referred to as the pink lady's slipper or moccasin flower. The specific epithet acaule means "lacking an obvious stem", a reference to its short underground stem, for which reason the plant is also known as the stemless lady's-slipper. It is the provincial flower of Prince Edward Island, Canada and the state wildflower of New Hampshire, United States.

Description
Cypripedium acaule is a perennial plant. Unlike most other species of Cypripedium, the pouch of C. acaule opens in a slit that runs down the front of the labellum rather than a round opening. The plant consists of two plicate leaves near the ground. From between those leaves sprouts a long, pubescent stalk that bears a single pink flower. The sepals and petals tend to be yellowish-brown to maroon with a large pouch that is usually some shade of pink but can be nearly magenta. Leaves are simple, elliptical in shape and opposite in arrangement.

Taxonomy
The genus Cypripedium is one of five genera in the subfamily of slipper orchids Cypripedioideae. Cypripedium acaule was first described by the Scottish botanist William Aiton in 1789. He referred to it as the two-leaved lady's slipper.

, Kew's Plants of the World Online (POWO) does not accept any infraspecific taxa. POWO lists a dozen synonyms, one of which is Cypripedium acaule f. albiflora , a form with a white pouch and green petals.

Distribution and habitat
Cypripedium acaule can be found in the eastern third of the United States, particularly in the Great Lakes Region and the Northeast in New Hampshire and Maine, south along the Appalachians to Alabama. It is widespread in Canada, where it is found in every province except British Columbia. It also occurs in the Northwest Territories and in St. Pierre & Miquelon. Within its geographic range, it can be found in a wide variety of environments, from coastal plains, to pine barrens, to mountaintops.

C. acaule requires highly acidic soil but tolerates a range of shade and moisture, though it prefers at least partial shade and well-drained slopes. It is usually found in pine forests, where it can be seen in large colonies, but it also grows in deciduous woods. It was long speculated that a fungus association was needed for growth, and that C. acaule could not be artificially cultivated outside of these associations. However, a greater understanding of orchids in general has shown that this association is only needed to germinate orchid seeds and is not required once plants begin making true leaves.

C. acaule is considered endangered in Illinois and Tennessee, Vulnerable in New York, and Unusual in Georgia.

Cultivation

Seed germination labs have increased the commercial availability of C. acaule, although it still tends to be less commonly available than other Cypripedium species and hybrids. This is primarily due to the extra care that must be provided if the growing site is not naturally suitable for in-ground cultivation. This plant grows in soils below a pH of 5, often at 4–4.5. At this high acidity soil fungus is suppressed, and C. acaule can thrive. There is even evidence that it is partially myco-heterotrophic, parasitizing fungus that attempts to invade its roots. However, in soils above pH 5, soil microbes become more than C. acaule can manage, and the plants rot. Seedlings germinated in a sterile environment can grow and thrive in a much higher pH than 5, but must be grown below 5 if removed from the sterility.

For artificial cultivation, container culture is a must, and the growing medium must be naturally acidic. Additionally, all other soil additives must be devoid of any calcium that could buffer the pH to above 5. High quality peat moss or pine duff work well, and pH neutral perlite can be added to improve porosity. Due to the risk of calcium bicarbonate, tap water is unsuitable. Give bright dappled shade or morning sun. Sink pots in winter or store in a cold frame for insulation. Given these conditions, C. acaule can thrive indefinitely, but it will always require much more maintenance than other species/hybrids that can be grown in a wider pH range.

References

External links
 
 
 
 
 
 
 
 Flora of Pennsylvania

acaule
Orchids of Canada
Orchids of the United States
Orchids of Kentucky
Flora of the Eastern United States
Flora of the Great Lakes region (North America)
Flora of the Northeastern United States
Flora of the Southeastern United States
Flora of the Appalachian Mountains
Plants described in 1789